Issouf Kaboré is a Burkinabè professional footballer who plays as a midfielder for Étoile Filante de Ouagadougou and the Burkina Faso national football team.

International career
In January 2014, coach Brama Traore invited him to be a part of the Burkina Faso squad for the 2014 African Nations Championship. The team was eliminated in the group stages after losing to Uganda and Zimbabwe and then drawing with Morocco.

International goals
Scores and results list Burkina Faso's goal tally first.

References

Living people
Burkinabé footballers
2014 African Nations Championship players
Burkina Faso A' international footballers
Étoile Filante de Ouagadougou players
1993 births
Association football midfielders
Burkina Faso international footballers
21st-century Burkinabé people
2018 African Nations Championship players